Carnell is an English language occupational surname for a crossbow man. It may also be used as a given name. Carnell may refer to:

Surname
Andrew Carnell (1877–1951), Canadian politician
Arthur Carnell (1862–1940), British sport shooter
Artie Carnell (1909–1942), Australian rugby league footballer
Bradley Carnell (born 1977), South African football player
Edward John Carnell (1919–1967), Christian theologian
Geoffrey Carnell (1915–1987), Newfoundland politician
Ian Carnell (born 1955), Australian public servant
John Carnell (1912–1972), British editor
Kate Carnell (born 1955), Australian politician
Laura H. Carnell (1867–1929), American educator 
Richard S. Carnell (born 1953), American lawyer
Samuel Carnell (1832–1920), New Zealand politician
Stanley Carnell (1903–1989), Canadian politician

Given name
Carnell Breeding (born 1991), American musician
Carnell Lake (born 1967), American football player and coach

Places
Carnell Estate, Ayrshire, Scotland
Carnell Peak, Antarctica

References

Surnames
English-language surnames